Cassinia copensis is a species of flowering plant in the family Asteraceae and is endemic to eastern Australia. It is an erect, multi-stemmed shrub with aromatic, cylindrical leaves, and heads of creamy-white flowers arranged in a flattened corymb.

Description
The upper surface of the leaves is sticky with a sunken midrib and the lower surface is densely covered woolly white hairs. The heads are arranged in a flattened corymb of one hundred to two hundred florets.

Taxonomy and naming
Cassinia copensis was first formally described in 2004 by Anthony Edward Orchard in Australian Systematic Botany from specimens he collected near Copes Creek on the road between Bundarra and Inverell in 2004.

Distribution and habitat
This species of Cassinia grows in forest and woodland in the watershed of Copes Creek in New South Wales and near Wallangarra in Queensland, near the border with New South Wales.

References

copensis
Asterales of Australia
Flora of New South Wales
Flora of Queensland
Plants described in 2004